Events from the year 1651 in art.

Events
 Fontana dei Quattro Fiumi or "Fountain of the Four Rivers" completed by Gian Lorenzo Bernini

Paintings

 David Bailly – Self-portrait with Vanitas symbols (approximate date)
 Guercino - The Libyan Sibyl
 Jacob Jordaens – The Triumph of Frederik Hendrik
 Nicolas Poussin
 The Finding of Moses
 The Holy Family
 Salvator Rosa – Democritus amid the Tombs
 David Teniers the Younger – Erzherzog Leopold Wilhelm in seiner Galerie in Brüssel ("Archduke Leopold William in his Gallery at Brussels")
 Diego Velázquez – The Rokeby Venus (c.1647-1651)

Births
August 13 - Balthasar Permoser, Austrian sculptor (died 1732)
date unknown
Niccolò Bambini, Italian painter of the late-Renaissance and early-Baroque periods (died 1736)
Teresa Maria Languasco, Italian painter and monk (died 1698)
Willem van Ingen, Dutch Golden Age painter active in Italy (died 1708)
François-Alexandre Verdier, French painter, draftsman and engraver (died 1730)

Deaths
January - Jacob Franquart, Flemish painter, court architect and copper plate engraver (born 1582)
January 27 - Abraham Bloemaert, painter (born 1566)
May 9 - Cornelis de Vos, Flemish painter (born 1584)
August 16 - Henricus Hondius II, Dutch engraver, cartographer and publisher (born 1597)
August 27 – Jacob Adriaensz Backer, Dutch painter (born 1609)
September 12 - Felix Castello, Spanish painter (born 1595)
November 22 - Giovanni Battista Soria, Italian architect (born 1581)
December 6 - Anna Visscher, Dutch artist, poet, and translator (born 1584)
date unknown
Friedrich Brentel, German printmaker in engraving and etching, and miniature painter (born 1580)
Giovanni Domenico Cappellino Italian painter, active mainly in his native Genoa (born 1580)
Dirck Cornelis de Hooch, Dutch portrait painter (born 1613)
Panfilo Nuvolone, Italian Mannerist painter (born 1581)
Kanō Sansetsu, Japanese painter (born 1589)
John Taylor, portrait painter (born 1585)
Jan van den Hoecke, Antwerp painter and draftsman (born 1611)
Floris van Dyck, Dutch still life painter (born 1575)
Joris van Schooten, Dutch Golden Age painter (born 1587)
probable - Francesco Guarino, Italian painter active mainly in Irpinia (born 1611)

 
Years of the 17th century in art
1650s in art